Stamp seal (BM 119999), is a historical stamp seal from the British Museum, with reference number BM 119999, located in Room 52 of the museum. The stamp seal was procured by Sir Alexander Cunningham, who sold it to the British Museum in 1870. Another, nearly identical, seal, is located in the Calcutta Museum.

Description
The seal is made of carnelian, a precious stone, and rather hard to engrave. It is considered as "a Sogdian double portrait". It shows two facing busts. One is a bearded male, wearing a forward-projecting cap bordered with pearls, as well as a diadem, ear-rings and a necklace. The other wears a radiate crown with royal ribbons. Above is an inscription in two lines, in the Sogdian language.

Other examples
The design with two facing busts is also visible in some of the coinage of the period, although the small space of the coins seems to have forced to two busts to come closer together. It has been suggested that this design was influenced by some Byzantine coins, but this may not be necessarily so.

Kushano-Sasanian period (c.230 – c.365 CE)
The stamp seal is dated by the British Museum to 300-350 CE, during the Kushano-Sasanian period, and belongs to the area of Sogdia, north of the Oxus. In this, the museum follows the conclusions of Bivar (1969), and Livshits (1969), according to which the seal should be dated to the 4th century CE. Livshits (1969) also offered a reading for the Sogdian inscription, which is the one still used by the British Museum:

Paleographical comparisons also suggests a "rough date" of the 4th century CE, and at any rate before the second half of the 5th century CE. Stylistically, the stamp seal is said to share the artistic characteristics of other known Kushano-Sasanians seals, but also Hephthalites seals.

Hephthalite period (c.440 – c.560 CE)
Livshits (2000) has since reappraised the datation of the stamp seal as well as the translation of the Sogdian legend. In his latest analysis, he thought that the seal should be dated to the 5th-6th century CE, and should read:

Kurbanov (2010) considers that the seal is characteristic of Hephthalite seals.

Related artifacts

References

Asian objects in the British Museum